Hattie is an extinct town in southeast Texas County, in the U.S. state of Missouri. The GNIS classifies it as a populated place. The community is on the South Prong Jacks Fork, south of Missouri Route Y, and two miles north of the county line. 

A post office called Hattie was established in 1891, and remained in operation until 1957. The community has the name of Hattie Cross, the wife of an early settler.

References

Ghost towns in Missouri
Former populated places in Texas County, Missouri